A hospital information system (HIS) is an element of health informatics that focuses mainly on the administrational needs of hospitals. In many implementations, a HIS is a comprehensive, integrated information system designed to manage all the aspects of a hospital's operation, such as medical, administrative, financial, and legal issues and the corresponding processing of services. Hospital information system is also known as hospital management software (HMS) or hospital management system.

Hospital information systems provide a common source of information about a patient's health history, and doctors schedule timing. The system has to keep data in a secure place and controls who can reach the data in certain circumstances. These systems enhance the ability of health care professionals to coordinate care by providing a patient's health information and visit history at the place and time that it is needed. Patient's laboratory test information also includes visual results such as X-ray, which may be reachable by professionals. HIS provide internal and external communication among health care providers. Portable devices such as smartphones and tablet computers may be used at the bedside.

Hospital information systems are often composed of one or several software components with specialty-specific extensions, as well as of a large variety of sub-systems in medical specialties from a multi-vendor market. Specialized implementations name for example laboratory information system (LIS), Policy and Procedure Management System, radiology information system (RIS) or picture archiving and communication system (PACS).

Potential benefits of hospital information systems include:
Efficient and accurate administration of finance, diet of patient, engineering, and distribution of medical aid. It helps to view a broad picture of hospital growth
Improved monitoring of drug usage, and study of effectiveness. This leads to the reduction of adverse drug interactions while promoting more appropriate pharmaceutical utilization.
Enhances information integrity, reduces transcription errors, and reduces duplication of information entries.
Hospital software is easy to use and eliminates error caused by handwriting. New technology computer systems give perfect performance to pull up information from server or cloud servers.

See also

 Clinical documentation improvement
 Cloud computing
 
 DICOM
 Electronic health record (EHR)
 European Institute for Health Records (EuroRec)
 Health information management
 Health information technology
 Import and export of data (medical data export and sharing between hospitals)
 List of open source healthcare software
 Medical imaging
 Medical record
 Personal health record
 Patient tracking system
 Solid health

References

Nursing informatics
Management cybernetics